Strange Affair is a 1944 mystery-comedy film starring Allyn Joslyn, Evelyn Keyes, Marguerite Chapman, and Edgar Buchanan.  Directed by Alfred E. Green, it was based on Oscar Saul's short story Stalk the Hunter.

Plot
A comic strip creator and his wife investigate a murder at a charity benefit.

Cast
 Allyn Joslyn as Bill Harrison
 Evelyn Keyes as Jacqueline "Jack" Harrison
 Marguerite Chapman as Marie Dumont Baumler
 Edgar Buchanan as Lt. Washburn
 Nina Foch as Frieda Brenner
 Hugo Haas as Domino / Constantine
 Shemp Howard as Laundry Truck Driver
 Frank Jenks as Sgt. Erwin
 Erwin Kalser as Dr. Brenner
 Tonio Selwart as Leslie Carlson
 John Wengraf as Rudolph Kruger

References

External links

Review of film at Variety

1944 films
Columbia Pictures films
Films directed by Alfred E. Green
1940s mystery drama films
American mystery drama films
American black-and-white films
1944 drama films
Films based on short fiction
1940s American films